Uruava is an extinct Austronesian language formerly spoken in southeast Bougainville, Papua New Guinea.

The language was spoken around the Arawa. It was recorded shortly before its speakers shifted to the non-Austronesian Nasioi language.

References

Extinct languages of Oceania
Northwest Solomonic languages
Languages of the Autonomous Region of Bougainville